Van Ooijen or Van Ooyen is a Dutch toponymic surname meaning "from/of Ooijen". The Middle Dutch word Ooije or Oije signified a (waterlogged) meadow in a river bend. People with the surname include:

Van Ooijen / Van Ooyen
David van Ooijen (1939–2006), Dutch Roman Catholic priest and politician
Peter van Ooijen (born 1992), Dutch football midfielder
Romy van Ooijen (born 1971), Dutch pop singer
Willi van Ooyen (born 1947), German Linke Party politician
Van Oijen / Van Oyen
Alisa Van Oijen (born 1992), Australian racing cyclist
Cornelius van Oyen (1886–1954), German sports shooter
Ludolph Hendrik van Oyen (1889–1953), Dutch Chief of Staff of the Royal Netherlands East Indies Army

References

Dutch-language surnames
Toponymic surnames